This article contains information about the literary events and publications of 1540.

Events
July 22 – Klemens Janicki is appointed poeta laureatus by Pope Paul III.
December 13 – John Standish's religious work  is printed by Elisabeth Pickering, the first work known to be printed in London by a woman.
unknown dates
The first known book from the first printing press in North America, set up in Mexico City, is published, Manual de Adultos.
Sir David Lyndsay's Middle Scots satirical morality play A Satire of the Three Estates is given a private first performance.
Lazare de Baif travels with Pierre de Ronsard to Alsace, where they meet northern humanists.

New books

Prose

Garci Rodríguez de Montalvo – Amadis de Gaula Book 1 (translated into French by Nicolas de Herberay des Essarts at request of Francis I of France)
Hector Boece – Historia Scotorum (translated into Middle Scots by John Bellenden at request of James V of Scotland)
Rösslin – The Byrth of Mankynde (translation attributed to Richard Jonas) 
Georg Joachim Rheticus – De libris revolutionum Copernici narratio prima (abstract of Copernicus' De revolutionibus orbium coelestium)

Poetry

Tontada Siddhesavara – Shatsthala Jnanamrita
Souterliedekens (Dutch metrical psalter dedicated to and perhaps compiled by Willem van Zuylen van Nijevelt)

Approximate year
Sir Thomas More – Lady Fortune
Girolamo Schola –

Births
January 26 – Florent Chrestien, French satirist and Latin poet (died 1596)
June 11 – Barnabe Googe, English pastoral poet and translator (died 1594)
unknown dates
Pierre de Bourdeille, seigneur de Brantôme, French soldier, historian and poet (died 1614)
Rhys Cain, Welsh-language poet (died 1614)
Frei Agostinho da Cruz (brother of Diogo Bernardes), Portuguese poet (died 1619)

Deaths
May 6 – Juan Luis Vives, Spanish humanist polymath (born 1493)
May 22 – Francesco Guicciardini, Italian historian and statesman (born 1483)
October 5 – Helius Eobanus Hessus, German Latin poet (born 1488)
October – Robert Redman, London printer

References

1540

1540 books
 
Renaissance literature
Early Modern literature
Years of the 16th century in literature